The Illawarra District Rugby Union, or IDRU, is the governing body for the sport of rugby union within the District of  Illawarra, New South Wales in Australia. It is a member of the New South Wales Country Rugby Union.

Illawarra clubs

Men's
The clubs that compete in the men's senior grade competition are:

First-grade clubs 

  Avondale https://wombatsrugbyunion.teamapp.com/
  Bowral https://bowralrugby.com.au/
  Camden Rams  http://www.camdenrugby.com.au/
  Campbelltown Harlequins
  Kiama http://www.kiamarugby.com/
  Shoalhaven (Nowra) http://shoalhavenrugby.com.au/
  Tech Waratahs https://wollongongtechwaratahsrfc.teamapp.com/
  University of Wollongong http://www.wollongongunirugby.weebly.com
  Vikings https://web.archive.org/web/20150522000228/http://www.wollongongvikings.rugbynet.com.au/
  Woonona Shamrocks RUFC https://www.shamrocksrugby.com.au/

Lower-grade clubs 

  Wollondilly White Waratahs
  Southern Crushers Rugby
  Vincentia

Women's
Women's senior rugby is represented through University of Wollongong, who compete in Sydney's Jack Scott Cup against; West Harbour, Eastern Suburbs, Sydney University, Parramatta, Blacktown, Warringah and Campbellton.

Kiama Sevens 
Kiama Sevens is an annual ARU club tournament that attracts local, interstate and international teams. The first tournament was run in 1973. In 2018, the tournament will be in its 47th year.

Representative teams 
The IDRU selects representative teams each year which play under the name "Illawarriors". The senior men's team and junior age-group teams compete in the annual New South Wales Country Rugby Union championship. Country Cockatoos is a team selected from the NSW Country Regions (Illawarra, Hunter, Central Coast, New England, Central West, Western Plains, Central North) that compete against ACT Brumbies Provincial, NSW Subbies and Queensland Country.

Caldwell Cup results – seniors 
2018 - Illawarra 37 - 15 Central West 
2017 - Newcastle Hunter 46 - 7 Illawarra 
2016 - Illawarra 31 - 17 Central Coast 
2015 - Illawarra 24 - 14 Newcastle Hunter 
2014 - Central West 19 - 5 Illawarra 
2013 - Newcastle Hunter 28 - 18 Illawarra 
2012 - Newcastle Hunter 29 - 13 Illawarra

NSW Country Cockatoos training squad 
2018 - Paul Tuala, Tom Baker, Takunda Chimwaza, Sam Latu, Amos Leef (University), Tim Small, Henry Yuill (Bowral), Leighton Cowley (Kiama), Aisake Tuevu (Tech-Waratahs), Dane Nethery (Vikings), Jay Spencer (Camden), Tait-Tania Tuumuliileuao (Avondale) 
2017 - Paul Tuala, Wayne Ngatai, Andy Papworth, Andrew Rae (University), Leighton Cowley (Kiama), Jesse Roche (Woonona), Henry Yuill (Bowral)  
2016 - Paul Tuala, Nik Rangiuira, Tyler Aitkin, Allyd Owen (University), Aaron Louden, Alex Wilson (Shoalhaven), Anthony Allport, Rhys Peters (Wonoona), Niko Degei (Kiama)

Women's country championships 
2018 - Lady Illawarriors

Illawarra premiers

1st-grade premiers 
2019 - Avondale def. Wonoona  
2018 - Bowral 34 - 18 Avondale 
2017 - Avondale 27 - 12 Vikings 
2016 - University 10 - 7 Wonoona 
2015 - Avondale 39 - 31 University 
2014 - University 20 - 11 Camden 
2013 - Camden 20 - 10 Avondale 
2012 - Avondale 40 - 21 Tech-Waratahs 
2011 - Vikings 29 - 17 Avondale 
2010 - Vikings 37 - 0 Woonona 
2009 - Tech-Waratahs 19 - 14 Avondale 
2008 - Shoalhaven 27 - 12 Avondale

Geoff Shaw Medal – Grand Final Man of Match 
2018 - Tim Small (Bowral)
2017 - Andre Ltula (Avondale)
2016 - Rory Davis (Woonona)
2015 - Eli Sinoti (Avondale)
2014 - Andrew Lindsay (University)
2013 - Lee Russell (Camden)
2012 - Andre Ltula (Avondale)
2011 - Nick McAuley (Vikings)
2010 - Paul Fisher (Vikings)

2nd-grade premiers 
2018 - Bowral 28 - 18 Campbelltown
2017 - Bowral RUFC 35 - 10 Vikings
2016 - Campbelltown 27  - 26 Woonona
2015 - Camden 20 - 15 Camden
2014 - University 17 - 14 Avondale 
2013 - Vikings 42 - 15 Tech Waratahs
2012 - Vikings 25 - 10 Tech Waratahs
2011 - Avondale 41 - 15 Woonona
2010 - Vikings 22 - 17 Vincentia
2009 - Camden 14 - 7 Vincentia
2008 - Engadine Heathcote 20 - 12 Avondale

3rd-grade premiers 
2018 Camden 24 - 19 Shoalhaven
2017 Shoalhaven 24 - 0 Vikings 
2016 Vikings 23 - 15 Vincentia
2015 Vincentia 18 - 12 Vikings
2014 Tech-Waratahs 33 - 10 Avondale
2013 Wollondilly 38 - 17 University 	
2012 Camden 19 - 3 Tech-Waratahs
2011 Avondale 40 - 10 Vikings
2010 Avondale 19 - 15 University
2009 - Woonona 12 - 10 University
2008 - Avondale 19 - 10 Wollondilly

Colts/U20 
2018 No competition
2017 No competition
2016 University 10 - 7 Woonona	
2015 University 31 - 14 Campbelltown
2014 University 15 - 11 Woonona
2013 Vikings 47 - 10 Bowral
2004 Bowral 20 - 17 Kiama

Illawarra Club championship 
2018 - Avondale
2017 - Avondale
2016 - Woonona Shamrocks
2015 - Avondale
2014 - Avondale
2013 - Woonona Shamrocks
2012 - Avondale
2011 - Avondale

See also

Rugby union in New South Wales
List of Australian club rugby union competitions

References

External links
 
 

Rugby union governing bodies in New South Wales
Sport in Wollongong